José Eduardo Acevedo Herrera (born March 30, 1986) is a Venezuelan athlete.

Career
He competed in the 200 meters race at the 2008 Olympic Games in Beijing. He finished fifth in his heat with a time of 21.06 seconds, failing to reach the second round.

Personal bests
Outdoor
100 m: 10.45 s (wind: +0.0 m/s) –  Tempe, Arizona, 21 March 2009
200 m: 20.58 s NR (wind: +1.9 m/s) –  Fayetteville, Arkansas, 30 May 2008
400 m: 46.07 s –  Gainesville, Florida, 17 May 2009
Indoor
60 m: 6.76 s NR –  Lexington, Kentucky, 7 February 2009
200 m: 20.99 s NR –  Fayetteville, Arkansas, 14 March 2008
400 m: 47.08 s NR –  Fayetteville, Arkansas, 2 March 2008

Achievements

References

External links
 José Acevedo - IAAF.org Profile
 

1986 births
Living people
Venezuelan male sprinters
Athletes (track and field) at the 2008 Summer Olympics
Athletes (track and field) at the 2011 Pan American Games
Olympic athletes of Venezuela
Pan American Games bronze medalists for Venezuela
Pan American Games medalists in athletics (track and field)
South American Games silver medalists for Venezuela
South American Games medalists in athletics
Competitors at the 2002 South American Games
Medalists at the 2011 Pan American Games
Sportspeople from Caracas
21st-century Venezuelan people